Ingegerd Marie Hammarström (born 29 March 1982), born in Glanshammar, Sweden, is a Swedish football midfielder. She has played for Damallsvenskan teams KIF Örebro DFF, Umeå IK and Kopparbergs/Göteborg FC. She represented the Sweden women's national football team at the 2011 FIFA Women's World Cup, and scored the decisive goal against France to give her team third place in the tournament. She is the twin sister of Kristin Hammarström. Hammarström scored a goal in the quarterfinal against Iceland during the UEFA Women's Euro 2013.

In November 2013 both sisters announced their immediate retirement from football. A year later, after the birth of her first child, Hammarström was reportedly in talks with Sweden coach Pia Sundhage about a playing comeback.

In the 2017 Damallsvenskan season, Hammarström registered as a player with KIF Örebro DFF and made herself available to cover for injuries to first team players.

References

External links
 
 
 Profile at Swedish Football Association (SvFF) 

1982 births
Living people
Swedish women's footballers
Sweden women's international footballers
2011 FIFA Women's World Cup players
Footballers at the 2012 Summer Olympics
Olympic footballers of Sweden
Swedish twins
Twin sportspeople
KIF Örebro DFF players
Damallsvenskan players
BK Häcken FF players
People from Örebro Municipality
Women's association football midfielders
Sportspeople from Örebro County